Ponomaryovo is a rural locality (a selo) and the administrative center of Ponomaryovsky Selsoviet, Ust-Kalmansky District, Altai Krai, Russia. The population was 462 as of 2013. There are 15 streets.

Geography 
Ponomaryovo is located 23 km southwest of Ust-Kalmanka (the district's administrative centre) by road. Ust-Kamyshenka is the nearest rural locality.

References 

Rural localities in Ust-Kalmansky District